Malaysia competed at the 2020 Summer Olympics in Tokyo. Originally scheduled to take place from 24 July to 9 August 2020, the Games were postponed to 23 July to 8 August 2021, due to the COVID-19 pandemic. Since the nation's official debut in 1956 under the name Malaya, Malaysian athletes have appeared in every edition of the Summer Olympic Games, except for Moscow 1980 in Moscow because of the United States-led boycott.

Medalists

Background

Administration and preparation
Malaysian former badminton player and three times Olympic Silver medalist, Datuk Lee Chong Wei was appointed on 15 June 2019 as chef de mission of the Malaysian delegation to the Games by Olympic Council of Malaysia (OCM) president Tan Sri Dato' Sri Mohamad Norza Zakaria. However, he chose to skip the event due to his health concerns. He retained his role, albeit serving it virtually. Meanwhile, the national delegation in Tokyo is managed by OCM secretary-general Datuk Mohd Nazifuddin Najib, who is also the deputy chef-de-mission.

As with two previous Olympic cycles, Yonex-Sunrise provides the official kit for Team Malaysia, after it decided to extend its partnership with OCM until end of 2024.

Opening and closing ceremonies
For the opening ceremony, archer Khairul Anuar Mohamad and shuttler Goh Liu Ying were selected to carry the Malaysian flag in the opening ceremony. However, Khairul requested to be dropped as one of the flagbearers, as he had to focus for the archery competition a day after the ceremony. Shuttler Lee Zii Jia was announced to be Khairul's replacement. In the Parade of Nations, the Malaysian delegation was represented by five officials and eight athletes. Both the athletes and the officials participated in the parade wore the Malay legendary warrior Hang Tuah inspired attire designed by the Art and Design Faculty of Universiti Teknologi MARA (UiTM) in Shah Alam (Main Campus). The attire featured chevron geometric pattern in the colours of the national flag, which reflects the clear mission of the Malaysian team to achieve the country’s medal target. The female athletes wore the baju kurung complete with a dokoh (tiered pendant) and selendang (shawl), while the male athletes and officials wore the traditional Baju Melayu complete with the Tengkolok (headgear).

Diver Pandelela Rinong was named as flagbearer for the closing ceremony.

Target and achievement
On 19 July 2021, Youth and Sports Minister Datuk Seri Reezal Merican Naina Merican announced that the Malaysian delegation to the 2020 Summer Olympics had a target to win three medals, including a gold medal, with badminton, track cycling and diving being the main contenders of achieving the target.

However, the Malaysian delegation missed the target at the Games, having only won one silver medal through track cyclist Azizulhasni Awang in the Men's keirin event and one bronze medal through Men's doubles shuttlers Aaron Chia and Soh Wooi Yik. The result equalled the country's second-best achievement at the 1996 Summer Olympics in Atlanta, United States and the 2012 Summer Olympics in London, United Kingdom.

Broadcasters

Competitors
Malaysia managed to qualify 30 athletes competing in 10 sports for the 2020 Summer Olympics, with 13 of them being first time competitors. For the first time, the women (18 athletes or 60%) outnumbered the men (12 athletes/40%) on the Malaysian team competing at these Games.

The following is the list of number of competitors in the Games.

Archery

Two Malaysian archers Khairul Anuar Mohamad and Syaqiera Mashayikh qualified for the men's and women's individual and automatically to the mixed event, the men's individual recurve reached the quarterfinal stage and obtained one of the four available spots at the 2019 World Archery Championships in 's-Hertogenbosch, Netherlands. The women's individual recurve obtain a quota place assigned by world ranking.

Malaysia was absent from the men's archery team event for the first time since the 2008 Games, after failing to secure one of the last three spots to the Games offered in the 2021 Archery Final Olympic Qualification Tournament (FQT) in Paris, France, leaving Khairul as the nation's sole male representative. Khairul ended the ranking round of the men’s individual recurve event in 20th spot, shooting 72 arrows to collect 661 points. He then proceeded to the elimination stage and won through the one-arrow shoot-off in the first and second round against Finland’s Antti Vikstrom and China's Wang Dapeng respectively, only to be eliminated in the round of 16 after losing to South Korea's opponent Kim Woojin 0–6.

Syaqiera became the third Malaysian woman archer to feature in the Olympics after Mon Redee Sut Txi in Athens 2004 and Nurul Syafiqah Hashim in London 2012. She was the first Malaysian athlete to take an action at the Games. In the ranking round, she ended the competition in 43rd spot out of 64 archers with 630 points to improve on her previous record of 619 points which she achieved at the final Olympic qualifier in Paris. Syaqiera was eliminated in the first round (round of 64) after her 4–6 defeat against Russian Olympic Committee’s (ROC) competitor and eventual silver medalist, Elena Osipova.

The Malaysian duo failed to advance to the first round of the mixed team event, after scoring a combined total of 1,291 points in the ranking round, which placed them as the 19th best pair among 29 competing teams.

Athletics

Malaysian athletes further achieved the entry standards, either by qualifying time or by world ranking, in the following track and field events (up to a maximum of 3 athletes in each event):.

Track & road events

Field events

Badminton

Malaysia qualified a total of eight badminton players (four per gender) for the following events based on the BWF Race to Tokyo Rankings: one entry each in the men's and women's singles; and a pair each in the men's, women's, and mixed doubles.

Men

Women

Mixed

Cycling

Track
Following the completion of the 2020 UCI Track Cycling World Championships, Malaysia entered one rider to compete in the men's sprint and keirin based on his final individual UCI Olympic rankings.

Sprint

Keirin

Diving

Four Malaysian divers, all female, qualified for the following individual spots and synchronized teams at the Games through the 2019 FINA World Championships and 2019 Asian Cup. Additionally, Cheong Jun Hoong qualified to the Olympics after finishing eighteenth in the semifinal round of the women's platform in the 2021 FINA Diving World Cup thereby adding the country's number of divers to five. This was the first time that Malaysia did not have male representatives in diving since its debut at the 2000 Games in Sydney, Australia, as none of its male divers at least qualified through the World Cup.

Three of the five divers reached the final, including London 2012 bronze medalist and Rio 2016 Silver medalist Pandelela Rinong. For the first time since the London 2012 Summer Olympics, none of the divers secure a medal for the country, including Nur Dhabitah Sabri who narrowly missed the podium finish in the Women's 3 m springboard finals.

Golf

Malaysia entered one male and one female golfer into the Olympic tournament. Rio 2016 Olympian Gavin Green (world no. 286) qualified directly among the top 60 eligible players for the men's event based on the IGF World Rankings of 20 June 2021 while Kelly Tan (world no.154) also qualified directly on 29 June 2021.

Gymnastics

Artistic
Malaysia entered two artistic gymnasts into the Olympic competition for the first time since 2004. Farah Ann Abdul Hadi booked a spot in the women's individual all-around and apparatus events, by finishing sixteenth out of the twenty gymnasts eligible for qualification at the 2019 World Championships in Stuttgart, Germany. With the cancellation of the 2021 Asian Championships in Hangzhou, China, Jeremiah Loo Phay Xing secured the last of two available places in the men's individual all-around, as the next highest-ranked gymnast vying for qualification from the Asian zone at the 2019 World Artistic Gymnastics Championships in Stuttgart, Germany.

Men

Women

Sailing

Malaysian sailors qualified one boat in each of the following classes through the fleet-associated Worlds, the 2018 Asian Games, and the continental regattas.

M = Medal race; EL = Eliminated – did not advance into the medal race

Shooting

Malaysia granted an invitation from ISSF to send London 2012 Olympian Nur Suryani Mohd Taibi in women's rifle shooting to the Olympics, as long as the minimum qualifying score (MQS) was fulfilled by June 6, 2021. Nur Suryani competing in the women's 50 m rifle 3 positions failed to advance to that event's final. She scored 1142 in the qualification round, placing her as the 34th best shooter among 37 competitors.

Swimming

Malaysia received a universality invitation from FINA to send two top-ranked swimmers (one per gender) in their respective individual events to the Olympics, based on the FINA Points System of June 28, 2021.

Rio 2016 Olympians Welson Sim and Phee Jinq En failed to advance to the next round of their respective events. However, Phee smashed a Malaysian record of 1:08.40 in the women's 100 m breaststroke, eclipsing a tenth  of a second in her record time that she set from the 2019 Southeast Asian Games.

See also
Malaysia at the 2020 Summer Paralympics
Malaysia at the Olympics

External links
Team Malaysia – 2020 Summer Olympics NOC Profile

References

Nations at the 2020 Summer Olympics
2020
2020 in Malaysian sport